Kunal Kapoor (born 18 September 1987) is an Indian first-class cricketer who plays for Karnataka.

References

External links
 

1987 births
Living people
Indian cricketers
Karnataka cricketers
Cricketers from Bangalore